The Barton Oval, also known as "Barton Terrace Ovals", is a cricket ground in North Adelaide in the Australian state of South Australia. The first recorded match on the ground was in the 1968 season.

It located within the Adelaide Park Lands within a park known as "Denise Norton Park / Pardipardinyilla" and consists of two ovals, i.e. "East Oval" and "West Oval."

It  hosted  Women's Test matches between Australia and England.

See also
List of cricket grounds in Australia

References

External links
 CricketArchive
 Cricinfo

Cricket grounds in Australia
Sports venues in South Australia
Sports venues completed in 1961
Test cricket grounds in Australia
North Adelaide